Bactrocera brunnea is a species of Tephritidae fruit fly.

References

brunnea
Insects described in 1949